Madejski (feminine: Madejska; plural: Madejscy) is a Polish surname. It may refer to:
Edward Madejski (1914–1996), Polish footballer
Piotr Madejski (born 1983), Polish footballer
John Madejski (born 1941), British businessman
Madejski Stadium, Reading F.C.'s home venue, named after John Madejski, the club's chairman

See also
 

Polish-language surnames